Singlish (a portmanteau of Singapore and English) (officially similar and related to Singaporean English) is an English-based creole language spoken in Singapore. Singlish arose out of a situation of prolonged language contact between speakers of many different languages in Singapore, including Hokkien, Malay, Teochew, Cantonese and Tamil.

Singlish originated with the arrival of the British and the establishment of English-medium education in Singapore. Elements of English quickly filtered out of schools and onto the streets, resulting in the development of a pidgin language spoken by non-native speakers as a lingua franca used for communication between speakers of the many different languages used in Singapore. Singlish evolved mainly among the working classes who learned elements of English without formal schooling, mixing in elements of their native languages. After some time, this new pidgin language, now combined with substantial influences from Indian English, Peranakan, southern varieties of Chinese, Malay, and Tamil, became the primary language of the streets. As Singlish grew in popularity, children began to acquire Singlish as their native language, a process known as creolization. Through this process of creolization, Singlish became a fully-formed, stabilized and independent creole language, acquiring a more robust vocabulary and more complex grammar, with fixed phonology, syntax, morphology, and syntactic embedding.

Singlish shares many linguistic similarities with Manglish or Bazaar Malay of Malaysia, although a few distinctions can be made, particularly in vocabulary. Manglish generally receives more Malay influence and Singlish more Chinese (Mandarin, Hokkien, etc.) influence. Initially, Singlish and Manglish were essentially the same dialect evolving from the British Malaya economy, born in the trading ports of Singapore, Malacca and Penang when Singapore and Peninsular Malaysia were for many purposes a de facto (from 1963 to 1965, de jure) single entity. Ever since the two countries separated, a divergence has been observed.

Like all languages, Singlish and other creole languages show consistent internal logic and grammatical complexity. Due to its origins, Singlish shares many similarities with other English-based creole languages. As with many other creole languages, it is sometimes incorrectly perceived to be a "broken" form of the lexifier language - in this case, English. The uniqueness of Singlish has been studied by linguistics experts beyond Singapore.

Creole continuum
Singlish and English in Singapore exist along a creole continuum, ranging from standard English with local pronunciation on one end, to the most colloquial registers of Singlish on the other.

After Singapore's expulsion from Malaysia in 1965, and successive "Speak Mandarin" campaigns, a subtle language shift among the post-1965 generation became more and more evident as Malay idiomatic expressions were, and continued to be, displaced by idioms borrowed from Chinese spoken varieties, such as Hokkien.

The continuum runs through the following varieties:

Acrolectal: Acrolectal Singaporean English is very similar to Standard English as spoken in other English-speaking countries, with some differences in pronunciation.
Mesolectal: An intermediate form between Standard English and basilectal Singlish. At this level, a number of features not found in standard English begin to emerge.
Basilectal: This is the most colloquial form of speech. Here, one can find all of the unique phonological, lexical, and grammatical features of Singlish. Many of these features can be attributed to the influence of different Chinese varieties, Malay, and Indian languages such as Tamil, though some features appear to be innovations unique to Singlish. Both the basilect and mesolect are referred to as "Singlish".
Pidgin: This represents the first stage of development of the Singlish language, before creolisation took place and solidified Singlish as a fully-formed creole. As with all pidgins, speakers of the pidgin form of Singlish speak another language as a first language and Singlish as a second language. However, since a substantial number of people today learn Singlish natively, the number of speakers at the "pidgin" level of Singlish is dwindling. This is because by definition, a pidgin is not learned natively.

Since many Singaporeans can speak Standard English in addition to Singlish, code-switching can occur very frequently along the continuum. In addition, as many Singaporeans are also speakers of Chinese, Malay, or Indian languages such as Tamil or Hindi, code-switching between English and other languages also occurs dynamically.

Example 
Each of the following means the same thing, but the basilectal and mesolectal versions incorporate some colloquial additions for illustrative purposes.

Usage in society
The Infocomm Media Development Authority's free-to-air TV code states that the use of Singlish is only permitted in interviews, "where the interviewee speaks only Singlish," but the interviewer must refrain from using it. Despite this, in recent years the use of Singlish on television and radio has proliferated as localised Singlish continues to be popular among Singaporeans, especially in comedies, such as Under One Roof and Phua Chu Kang Pte Ltd. Singlish is sometimes used by ordinary people in street interviews broadcast on TV and radio on a daily basis, as well as occasionally in newspapers.

Although Singlish is officially discouraged in Singaporean schools, in practice, there is often some level of code-switching present in the classroom. This is rather inevitable given that Singlish is the home language of many students, and many teachers themselves are comfortable with the variety.

In many white-collar workplaces, Singlish is avoided in formal contexts, especially at job interviews, meetings with clients, presentations or meetings, where Standard English is preferred. Nevertheless, selected Singlish phrases are sometimes injected into discussions to build rapport or for a humorous effect, especially when the audience consists mainly of locals.

In informal settings, such as during conversation with friends, or transactions in kopitiams and shopping malls, Singlish is used without restriction. For many students, using Singlish is inevitable when interacting with their peers, siblings, parents and elders.Singapore humour writer Sylvia Toh Paik Choo was the first to put a spelling and a punctuation to Singlish in her books Eh Goondu (1982) and Lagi Goondu (1986), which are essentially a glossary of Singlish, which she terms 'Pasar Patois'. This is later followed by publishing of a few other Singlish books including Coxford Singlish Dictionary (2002) by Colin Goh, An Essential Guide to Singlish (2003) by Miel and The Three Little Pigs Lah (2013) by Casey Chen, and Spiaking Singlish: A companion to how Singaporeans Communicate (2017) by Gwee Li Sui.

In recent times, Singlish is considered by linguists to be an independent language with its own systematic grammar. Linguists from universities around the world have referred to local productions to demonstrate to students how Singlish has become a unique language variety. There have been recent surges in interest in Singlish usage, sparking national conversations. In 2016, Oxford English Dictionary (OED) announced that it has added 19 new "Singapore English" items such as ang moh, shiok and sabo in both its online and printed versions. Several Singlish words had previously made it into the OED's online version, which launched in March 2000. Words such as lah and sinseh were already included in OED's debut, while kiasu made it into the online list in March 2007. Local celebrities were generally pleased for this Singaporean identity to be recognized on a global level.

Due in part to this perception of Singlish as "broken English", the use of Singlish is greatly frowned on by the government. In 2000, the government launched the Speak Good English Movement to eradicate Singlish, although more recent Speak Good English campaigns are conducted with tacit acceptance of Singlish as valid for informal usage. Several current and former Singaporean prime ministers have publicly spoken out against Singlish. However, the prevailing view among contemporary linguists is that, regardless of perceptions that a dialect or language is "better" or "worse" than its counterparts, when dialects and languages are assessed "on purely linguistic grounds, all languages—and all dialects—have equal merit".

Phonology

Variation
Singlish pronunciation, while built on a base of British English, is heavily influenced by Malay, Hokkien and Cantonese. There are variations within Singlish, both geographically and ethnically. Chinese, Native Malays, Indians, Eurasians, and other ethnic groups in Singapore all have distinct accents, and the accentedness depends on factors such as formality of the context and language dominance of the speaker.

Consonants
The consonants in Singlish are given below:

(See International Phonetic Alphabet for an in-depth guide to the symbols.)

In general:
In syllable-final position, -th is pronounced as -f , so with and birth are pronounced weeff  and bəff  respectively. The dental fricatives do occur in acrolectal speech, though even among educated speakers there is some variation.
 The voiceless stops,  and are sometimes unaspirated, especially among Malays. (Aspiration refers to the strong puff of air that may accompany the release of these stop consonants.)  The acoustic effect of this is that the Singlish pronunciation of pat, tin and come sound more similar to bat, din, and gum than in other varieties of English.
(use your brain) and "'Don pray pray!'" (Don't play-play, i.e. Don't fool around) may seem to indicate, it is more of a self-deprecating, rather self-aware joke, like "died-ed".
Hence pall = paw , roll = row , tool = two , and for some, pearl = per 
 Syllabic consonants never occur. When the final  is vocalised, little and litter may be homophones.
 , the glottal stop, is inserted at the beginning of all words starting with a vowel, similar to German. As a result, final consonants do not experience liaison, i.e. run onto the next word. For example, "run out of eggs" would be very roughly "run-nout-to-veggs" in most dialects of English (e.g.  in General American), but "run 'out 'of 'eggs" (e.g. ) in Singlish. This contributes to what some have described as the 'staccato effect' of Singapore English.
  replaces final plosive consonants of syllables in regular- to fast-paced speed speech, especially stops: Goodwood Park becomes Gu'-wu' Pa  , and there may be a glottal stop at the end of words such as back and out. Like in Cambodian, where a final 'g' becomes a 'k', bad becomes bat with an unaspirated 't'.
 In final position, the distinction between voiced and voiceless soundsi.e.  & ,  & , etc.is usually not maintained (Final-obstruent devoicing). As a result, cease = seize  and race = raise . This leads to some mergers of noun/verb pairs, such as belief with believe 
 Final consonant clusters simplify, especially in fast speech.

Vowels

Broadly speaking, there is a one-to-many mapping of Singlish vowel phonemes to British Received Pronunciation vowel phonemes, with a few exceptions (as discussed below, with regard to egg and peg). The following describes a typical system.Deterding, David and Poedjosoedarmo, Gloria (1998) The Sounds of English: Phonetics and Phonology for English Teachers in Southeast Asia, Singapore: Prentice Hall, p. 156. There is generally no distinction between the non-close front monophthongs, so pet and pat are pronounced the same .

At the acrolectal level, the merged vowel phonemes are distinguished to some extent. These speakers may make a distinction between the tense vowels  and the lax vowels  respectively. Some speakers introduce elements from American English, such as pre-consonantal  (pronouncing the "r" in bird, port, etc.). This is caused by the popularity of American TV programming. Current estimates are that about 20 per cent of university undergraduates sometimes use this American-style pre-consonantal  when reading a passage.

Vowel comparison between Singlish and English diaphonemic system:

  remains  in Singlish, except when followed by a voiced plosive (or ), in which case it becomes  among some speakers. However, this is not entirely predictable, as egg has a close vowel (so it rhymes with vague) while peg has an open vowel (and rhymes with tag); and similarly for most speakers bed has a close vowel (so it rhymes with made), while fed has a more open vowel (the same vowel as in bad). Which vowel occurs in each word therefore appears in these cases not to be predictable.
 Examples of words have idiosyncratic pronunciations: flour  (expected:  = flower); and their  (expected:  = there). Flour/flower and their/there are therefore not homophones in Singlish. This also applies to Manglish.
 In general, Singlish vowels are tenserthere are no lax vowels (which RP has in pit, put, and so forth).
 The vowels in words such as day  and low  are pronounced with less glide than the comparable diphthongs in RP, so they can be regarded as monophthongsi.e. vowels with no glide.Lee, Ee May and Lim, Lisa (2000) 'Diphthongs in Singaporean English: their realisations across different formality levels, and some attitudes of listeners towards them'. In Adam Brown, David Deterding and Low Ee Ling (eds.), The English Language in Singapore: Research on Pronunciation, Singapore: Singapore Association for Applied Linguistics, pp. 100-111.
 Where other varieties of English have an unstressed , i.e. a reduced vowel, Singlish tends to use the full vowel based on orthography. This can be seen in words such as accept , example , purchase , maintenance , presentation , and so on. However, this does not mean that the reduced vowel  never occurs, as about and again have  in their first syllable. It seems that the letter 'a' is often pronounced , but the letter 'o' usually has a full vowel quality, especially in the con- prefix (control, consider, etc.). There is a greater tendency to use a full vowel in a syllable which is closed off with a final consonant, so a full vowel is much more likely at the start of absorb  than afford .
 In loanwords from Hokkien that contain nasal vowels, the nasalisation is often keptone prominent example being the mood particle hor, pronounced .

Tone

Singlish is semi-tonal as words of Sinitic origin generally retain their original tones in Singlish. On the other hand, original English words as well as words of Malay and Tamil origin are non-tonal.

Prosody

One of the most prominent and noticeable features of Singlish is its unique intonation pattern, which is quite unlike non-creole varieties of English. For example:
 Singlish is syllable-timed compared to most varieties of English, which are usually stress-timed.Deterding, David (2001) 'The Measurement of Rhythm: A Comparison of Singapore and British English', Journal of Phonetics, 29 (2), 217–230. This in turn gives Singlish rather a staccato feel.
 There is a tendency to use a rise-fall tone to indicate special emphasis. A rise-fall tone can occur quite often on the final word of an utterance, for example on the word cycle in "I will try to go to the park to cycle" without carrying any of the suggestive meaning associated with a rise-fall tone in British English. In fact, a rise-fall tone may be found on as many as 21 per cent of declaratives, and this use of the tone can convey a sense of strong approval or disapproval.
 There is a lack of the de-accenting that is found in most dialects of English (e.g. British and American), so information that is repeated or predictable is still given full prominence.
 There is often an 'early booster' at the start of an utterance, so an utterance like "I think they are quite nice and interesting magazines" may have a very high pitch occurring on the word think.
 There may be greater movement over individual syllables in Singlish than in other varieties of English. This makes Singlish sound as if it has the tones of Chinese, especially when speakers sometimes maintain the original tones of words that are borrowed into Singlish from Chinese.

Overall, the differences between the different ethnic communities in Singapore are most evident in the patterns of intonation, so for example Malay Singaporeans often have the main pitch excursion later in an utterance than ethnically Chinese and Indian Singaporeans.

Generally, these pronunciation patterns are thought to have increased the clarity of Singlish communications between pidgin-level speakers in often noisy environments, and these features were retained in creolisation.

Grammar
The grammar of Singlish has been heavily influenced by other languages in the region, such as Malay and Chinese, with some structures being identical to ones in Chinese varieties. As a result, Singlish has acquired some unique features, especially at the basilectal level.

Topic prominence
Singlish is topic-prominent, like Chinese and Malay. This means that Singlish sentences often begin with a topic (or a known reference of the conversation), followed by a comment (or new information).Tan, Ludwig (2007) Null Arguments in Singapore Colloquial English. Unpublished PhD thesis, University of Cambridge. Compared to Standard English, the semantic relationship between topic and comment is not important; moreover, nouns, verbs, adverbs, and even entire subject-verb-object phrases can all serve as the topic:

The above constructions can be translated analogously into Malay and Chinese, with little change to the word order.

The topic can be omitted when the context is clear, or shared between clauses. This results in constructions that appear to be missing a subject to a speaker of Standard English, and so called PRO-drop utterances may be regarded as a diagnostic feature of Singlish. For example:

Nouns
Nouns are optionally marked for plurality. Articles are also optional. For example:
 He can play piano.
 I like to read storybook.
 Your computer got virus or not?  – Does your computer have a virus? This one ten cent only.  – This one only costs 10 cents.It is more common to mark the plural in the presence of a modifier that implies plurality, such as many or four.

Many nouns which seem logically to refer to a countable item are used in the plural, including furniture and clothing. Examples of this usage from corpus recordings are:
 So I bought a lot of furnitures from IKEA.
 Where are all the stuffs I ordered?
 I had to borrow some winter clothings.

Copula

The copula, which is the verb to be in most varieties of English, is treated somewhat differently in Singlish:

The copula is generally not used with adjectives or adjective phrases:
 I damn naughty.

 Dis house very nice.

It is also common for the present participle of the verb to be used without the copula:
 I still finding.
 How come you so late still playing music, ah?
 You looking for trouble, is it?

The zero copula is also found, although less frequently, as an equative between two nouns, or as a locative:
 Dat one his wife lah. ('That lady is his wife.')
 Dis boy the class monitor. (= a subset of the disciplinary system; a monitor is empowered to enforce discipline by being an informant in the absence of the teacher or superior authority figure but his/her authority is restricted to the class; this is unlike a prefect whose authority is house-wide or even school-wide)
 His house in Toa Payoh

In general, the zero copula is found more frequently after nouns and pronouns (except I, he, and she), and much less after a clause (what I think is...) or a demonstrative (this is...).

Past tense

Past tense marking is optional in Singlish. Marking of the past tense occurs most often in irregular verbs, as well as verbs where the past tense suffix is pronounced . For example:
 I went to Orchard Road yesterday.
 He accepted in the end.

 He talk so long, never stop, I ask him also never.'He talked for so long without stopping and wouldn't even stop when I asked him to.'

The past tense is more likely to be marked if the verb describes an isolated event (it is a punctual verb), and it tends to be unmarked if the verb in question represents an action that goes on for an extended period:
 When I young ah, I go school every day.
 When he was in school, he always get good marks one.
 Last night I mug so much, so sian already.'Last night I studied so much that I became very tired.'

There seems also to be a tendency to avoid use of the past tense to refer to someone who is still alive:
 The tour guide speak Mandarin.

Note in the final example that although the speaker is narrating a story, she probably uses the present tense in the belief that the tour guide is probably still alive.

Change of state

Instead of the past tense, a change of state can be expressed by adding already or liao to the end of the sentence, analogous to the Chinese . This is not the same as the past tense, but more of an aspect, as it does not cover past habitual or continuous occurrences, and it refers to a real or hypothetical change of state in the past, present or future.

The frequent use of already (pronounced more like "oreddy" and sometimes spelt that way) in Singlish is probably a direct influence of the Hokkien  particle. For example:
 Aiyah, cannot wait any more, must go already. (Oh dear, I cannot wait any longer. I must leave immediately.)
 Yesterday, dey go there already. (They already went there yesterday.)
 Ah Song kena sai already, then how? (Ah Song has gotten into trouble, what will you do (now)?)

Some examples of the direct use of liao:
 He throw liao. (He has already thrown it away.)
 I eat liao. (I ate or I have eaten.)
 This new game, you play liao or not? (As for this new game, have you played it yet?)

Negation

Negation works in general like English, with not added after to be, to have, or modals, and don't before all other verbs. Contractions (can't, shouldn't) are used alongside their uncontracted forms. However, due to final cluster simplification, the -t drops out from negative forms, and -n may also drop out after nasalising the previous vowel. This makes nasalisation the only mark of the negative.

 I do/don't want.'I don't want to.'

Another effect of this is that in the verb can, its positive and negative forms are distinguished only by the vowel:
 This one can  do lah.
 This one can't  do lah.

Also, never is used as a negative past tense marker, and does not have to carry the English meaning. In this construction, the negated verb is never put into the past-tense form:
 How come today you never (=didn't) hand in homework?
 How come he never (=didn't) pay just now?

Interrogative

In addition to the usual way of forming yes–no questions, Singlish uses two more constructions:

In a construction similar (but not identical) to Chinese A-not-A, or not is appended to the end of sentences to form yes/no questions. Or not cannot be used with sentences already in the negative:
 You want this book or not?Do you want this book? Can or not?Is this possible / permissible?The phrase is it, appended to the end of sentences, forms yes–no questions. Is it implies that the speaker is simply confirming something they have already inferred:
 They never study, is it? (No wonder they failed!)
 You don't like that, is it? (No wonder you had that face!)
 Alamak, you guys never read newspaper is it?"What? Haven't you guys ever read a newspaper?" (No wonder you aren't up to date!)

The phrase isn't it also occurs when the speaker thinks the hearer might disagree with the assertion.

There are also many discourse particles (such as hah, hor, meh, and ar) used in questions. (See the  "Discourse particles" section elsewhere in this article.)

Reduplication

Another feature strongly reminiscent of Chinese and Malay, verbs are often repeated (e.g. TV personality Phua Chu Kang's "don't pray-pray!" pray = play). In general verbs are repeated twice to indicate the delimitative aspect (that the action goes on for a short period), and three times to indicate greater length and continuity:
 You go ting ting a little bit, maybe den you get answer. ('Go and think over it for a while, and then you might understand.')
 So what I do was, I sit down and I ting ting ting, until I get answer lor. ('So I sat down, thought, thought and thought, until I understood.')

The use of verb repetition also serves to provide a more vivid description of an activity:
 Want to go Orchard walk walk see see or not? ('Let's go shopping/sightseeing at Orchard Road.')
 Don't anyhow touch here touch there leh. ('Please don't mess with my things.')

In another usage reminiscent of Chinese, nouns referring to people can be repeated for intimacy. Most commonly, monosyllabic nouns are repeated:
 My boy-boy is going to Primary One oreddy. ('My son is about to enter Year/Grade/Standard One.')
 We two fren-fren one. ('We are close friends.')

However, occasionally reduplication is also found with disyllabic nouns:
 We buddy-buddy. You don't play me out, OK?
 I'm the kind who is buddy-buddy person.

Adjectives of one or two syllables can also be repeated for intensification:
 You go take the big-big one ah. ('Retrieve the larger item, please.')
 You want a raise from this boss? Wait long long ah. ('It will never happen.')

Discourse particles

In Singlish, discourse particles are minimal lexemes (words) that occur at the end of a sentence and that do not carry referential meaning, but may relate to linguistic modality, register or other pragmatic effects. They may be used to indicate how the speaker thinks that the content of the sentence relates to the participants' common knowledge or change the emotional character of the sentence.

Particles are noted for keeping their tones regardless of the remainder of the sentence. Most of the particles are borrowed from southern Chinese varieties, with the tones intact.

Research on Singlish discourse particles have been many but varied, often focusing on analysing their functions in the sentences they appear in.

Singlish phrasesWah Lau / WalaoWah lau is used as an interjection or exclamation at the beginning of a sentence, and it usually has a negative connotation. It is derived from a Hokkien or Teochew phrase that means 'my father', abbreviated form of "my father's".
 Wah lau! I can't believe the teacher gave us so much work to do in such a tight deadline!

Kena

Kena can be used as an auxiliary to mark the passive voice in some varieties of Singlish.

It is derived from a Malay word that means "to encounter or to come into physical contact", and is only used with objects that have a negative effect or connotation. Verbs after kena may appear in the infinitive form (i.e. without tense) or as a past participle. It is similar in meaning to passive markers in Chinese, such as Hokkien  or Mandarin :
 He kena scold/scolded.'He was scolded.'
 Dun listen, later you kena punish/punished then you know.'If you don't listen to me, you will be punished, after which you will know that you were wrong.'

Kena is not used with positive things:
*He kena praised.
*He kena lottery.
*He kena jackpot.

Use of kena as in the above examples will not be understood, and may even be greeted with a confused reply: "But strike lottery good wat!" ('But it's a good thing to win the lottery!').
However, when used in sarcasm, kena can be used in apparently positive circumstances, though with an ironic modicum of success, for example:
 He kena jackpot, come back to school after so long den got so much homework! ('He received a lot of homework upon returning to school after a long absence.')

When the context is given, kena may be used without a verb to mean 'will be punished.'
 Better do your homework, otherwise you kena. ('You will be punished unless you do your homework.')
 Don't listen to me, later you kena.

Using another auxiliary verb with kena is perfectly acceptable as well:
 Better do your homework, otherwise you will kena.
 Don't listen to me, later you will kena.

Tio

From Hokkien , tio (pronounced with a low tone due to Hokkien tone sandhi) can be used interchangeably with kena in many scenarios. While kena is often used in negative situations, tio can be used in both positive and negative situations.
 He tio cancer. ('He was diagnosed with cancer.')
 He tio jackpot. ('He struck the jackpot.')
 He tio lottery. ('He struck lottery.')
 Tio fined lor, what to do? ('I got fined, couldn't help it.')

Tio has a lighter negative tone when used negatively, compared to kena.
 Kena fined lor, what to do?
 Tio fined lor, what to do?

Both mean the same, but kena makes the speaker sound more unhappy with the situation than tio.

Tio also sounds more sympathetic when talking about an unfortunate incident about someone close.
 Her mum tio cancer. ('Her mum was diagnosed with cancer.')
 Sad sia, so young tio cancer. ('How sad, he was diagnosed with cancer at such a young age.')

Using kena in the following might not be appropriate, as they seem impolite, as if the speaker is mocking the victim.
 Her mum kena cancer.
 He kena cancer.

One

The word one is used to emphasise the predicate of the sentence by implying that it is unique and characteristic. One used in this way does not correspond to any use of the word one in Standard English. It might also be analysed as a relative pronoun, though it occurs at the end of the relative clause instead of the beginning (as in Standard English).
 Wah lau! So stupid one! – 'Oh my gosh! He's so stupid!'
 I do everything by habit one. – 'I always do everything by habit.'
 He never go school one. – 'He doesn't go to school (unlike other people).'
Is like that one. – 'It is how it is.'

Some bilingual speakers of Mandarin may also use  in place of one.

Then

The word then is often pronounced or written as den . When used, it represents different meanings in different contexts. In this section, the word is referred to as den.i) Den can be synonymous with so or therefore. It is used to replace the Chinese grammatical particle  (see ii).

When it is intended to carry the meaning of therefore, it is often used to explain one's blunder/negative consequences. In such contexts, it is a translation from Chinese . When used in this context, the den is prolonged twice the usual length in emphasis, as opposed to the short emphasis it is given when used to mean .
 Never do homework den (two beats with shifts in tone sandhi, tone 2) indicating replacement of ) kena scold lor.
– 'I did not do my homework, that's why (therefore) I got a scolding'
 Never do homework (pause) den (two beats with shifts in tone sandhi, tone 2) indicating replacement of ) kena scold lor.
– 'I did not do my homework; I got a scolding after that'
 Never do homework den (one beat with no shift in tone sandhi, indicating ) kena scold lor.
– 'It is only due to the fact that I did not do my homework that I was scolded.'

However, den cannot be freely interchanged with so.

The following examples are incorrect uses of den, which will sound grammatically illogical to a Singlish speaker: 
 I'm tired, den I'm going to sleep.
 I'm late, den I'm going to take a taxi.

The reason for this is that den often marks a negative, non-volitional outcome (either in the future or the past), while the above sentences express volition and are set in the present. Consider the following examples:
 I damn tired den langgar the car lor. – 'I was really tired, which is why I knocked into [that] car.'
 I late den take taxi, otherwise don't take. – 'When I'm late, [only] then do I take a taxi; otherwise I don't take taxis.' = 'I only take a taxi when I'm late.' (see usage vi)ii) Den is also used to describe an action that will be performed later. It is used to replace the Chinese particle . When used in this context, the den is pronounced in one beat, instead of being lengthened to two beats as in (i).

If shortened, the meaning will be changed or incorrectly conveyed. For example, "I go home liao, den (two beats) call you" will imbue the subtext with a questionable sense of irony, a lasciviousness for seduction (three beats), or just general inappropriateness (random two beats indicating a Hong Kong comedy-influenced moleitou  Singaporean sense of humour).
 I go home liao den call you. – 'I will call you when I reach home'
 Later den say. – 'We'll discuss this later'iii) Den can used at the beginning of a sentence as a link to the previous sentence. In such cases, it often carries a connotation of an exclamation.
 We were doing everything fine, den he fuck everything up
 I was at a park. Den hor, I was attacked by dinosaur leh!
 I woke up at 10. Den boss saw me coming in late. So suay!iv) Den can be used to return an insult/negative comment back to the originator. When used in such a way, there must first be an insult/negative comment from another party. In such contexts, it is a translation from the Chinese .
 A: You're so stupid!
 B: You den stupid la – 'You're the stupid one'
 A: You're late!
 B: You den late lor. – 'You're the late one'v) "Den?" can be used as a single-worded phrase. Even if den is used in a single-worded phrase, even with the same pronunciation, it can represent four different meanings. It can either be synonymous with "so what?", or it can be a sarcastic expression that the other party is making a statement that arose from his/her actions, or similarly an arrogant expression which indicating that the other party is stating the obvious, or it can be used as a short form for "what happened then?".

[Synonymous with "so what?"]
 A: I slept at 4 last night leh...
 B: Den?[Sarcastic expression] Speakers tend to emphasise the pronunciation of 'n'.

Context: A is supposed to meet B before meeting a larger group but A is late for the first meeting
 A: Late liao leh...
 B: Dennn?[Arrogant expression] Speakers have the option of using den in a phrase, as in "Ah bu den" or "Ah den". In this case it serves approximately the same purpose as 'duh' in American English slang.
 A: Wah ! You actually make this computer all by yourself ah?
 B: Ah bu den!

[Ah, but then? (What happened after that?)]
 A: I found $100 today...
 B: Den what?vi) Den can also indicate a conditional (an if-then condition), implying an omitted if/when:
 I late den take taxi, otherwise dun take. – 'When I'm late, [only] then do I take a taxi; otherwise I don't take taxis.' = 'I only take a taxi when I'm late.'
 You want to see Justin Bieber den go lah! – 'If you want to see Justin Bieber, then go [to the concert]!'

OiOi originating from the Hokkien, is commonly used in Singlish, as in other English varieties, to draw attention or to express surprise or indignation. Some examples of the usage of Oi include:
 Oi, you forgot to give me my pencil!
 Oi! Hear me can!
 Oi! You know how long I wait for you?!
 Oi! Wake up lah!

As oi has connotations of disapproval, it is considered to be slightly offensive if it is used in situations where a more polite register is expected, e.g. while speaking to strangers in public, people in the workplace or one's elders.

Lah
The ubiquitous word lah ( or ), sometimes spelled as la and rarely spelled as larh, luh or lurh, is used at the end of a sentence. It originates from the Chinese word or the same word in Malay.  It simultaneously softens the force of an utterance and entices solidarity, though it can also have the opposite meaning so it is used to signal power. In addition, there are suggestions that there is more than one lah particle, so there may be a stressed and an unstressed variant and perhaps as many as nine tonal variants, all having a special pragmatic function.

In Malay,  is used to change a verb into a command or to soften its tone, particularly when usage of the verb may seem impolite. Similarly, lah is frequently used with imperatives in Singlish:
 Drink lah!'Just drink!'

Lah also occurs frequently with yah and no (hence "Yah lah!" and "No lah!..."). This can, with the appropriate tone, result in a less-brusque declaration and facilitate the flow of conversation: "No more work to do, we go home lah!" However, if the preceding clause is already diminutive or jocular, suffixing it with -lah would be redundant and improper: one would not say "yep lah", "nope lah", or "ta lah" (as in the British ta for 'thank you').
 Lah with a low tone might indicate impatience.  "Eh, hurry up lah."

Lah is often used with brusque, short, negative responses:
 I dun have lah!'I just don't have any of that (which you were requesting)!'
 Dun know oreddy lah!'Argh, I don't know any more than what I told you!'or'I give up trying to understand this!'

Lah is also used for reassurance:
 Dun worry, he can one lah.'Don't worry, he will be capable of doing it.'
 Okay lah.'It's all right. Don't worry about it.'

Lah is sometimes used to curse people
 Go and die lah!

Lah can also be used to emphasise items in a spoken list, appearing after each item in the list.

Although lah can appear nearly anywhere, it does not appear with a yes-no question. Other particles are used instead:
 He do that ah?
 Later free or not?
 Don't tell me he punch her ah?

Wat

The particle wat, also spelled what, is used to remind or contradict the listener, especially when strengthening another assertion that follows from the current one:
 But he very good at Maths wat.'But he is very good at mathematics.' (Shouldn't you know this already, having known him for years?)
 You never give me wat!(It's not my fault, since) 'You didn't give it to me!' (Or else I would have gotten it, right?)
 I never punch him wat!(I did not punch him) 'I did not punch him!' (Or else I am the one, right?)

It can also be used to strengthen any assertion:
 The food there not bad wat. Can try lah.

This usage is noticeably characterised by a low tone on wat, and parallels the assertive Mandarin particle  in expressions like .

MahMah, originating from Chinese, is used to assert that something is obvious and final, and is usually used only with statements that are already patently true. It is often used to correct or cajole, and in some contexts is similar to English's duh. This may seem condescending to the listener:
 This one also can work one mah! – 'Can't you see that this choice will also work?'
 He also know about it mah! – 'He knew about it as well, [so it's not my fault!]'

Lor

Lor, also spelled lorh or loh, from Chinese, is a casual, sometimes jocular way to assert upon the listener either direct observations or obvious inferences. It also carries a sense of resignation, or alternatively, dismissiveness. that "it happens this way and can't be helped":
 If you don't do the work, then you die liao lor!'If you don't do the work, then you're dead!'
 Kay lor, you go and do what you want.'Fine, go ahead and do what you want.'
 Dun have work to do, den go home lor.'If you're done working, you should go home.'  (What are you waiting for?)
 Ya lor. Used when agreeing with someone

Leh

Leh, from Chinese, is used to soften a command, request, claim, or complaint that may be brusque otherwise:
 Gimme leh.'Please, just give it to me.'
 How come you don't give me leh?'Why aren't you giving it to me?'
 The ticket seriously ex leh.'Argh, the tickets are really expensive.'
 But I believe safe better than sorry leh.'The thing is, I believe it's better to be safe than sorry.'
 Why you never give up your seat leh?

Especially when on a low tone, it can be used to show the speaker's disapproval:
 You call her walk there, very far leh. ('If you ask her to go there on foot, it will be a rather long distance.')

Hor

Hor, from Hokkien, also spelled horh, is used to ask for the listener's attention and consent/support/agreement: It is usually pronounced with a low tone.
 Then hor, another person came out of the house.'And then, another person came out of the house.'
 This shopping center very nice hor?'This shopping centre is very nice, isn't it?'
 Oh yah hor! – 'Oh, yes!' (realising something)
Like that can hor? – 'So can it be done that way?'

Ar

Ar, also spelled arh or ah, is inserted between topic and comment. It often, but not always, gives a negative tone:
 This boy ah, always so rude one!'This boy is so rude!'

Ar with a rising tone is used to reiterate a rhetorical question:
 How come like dat one ah?'Why is it like that? / Why are you like that?'

Ar with a mid-level tone, on the other hand, is used to mark a genuine question that does require a response: (or not can also be used in this context):
 You going again ar?'Are you going again?'

Hah

Hah, also spelled har, originating from the British English word huh or Hokkien, is used to express disbelief, shock or used in a questioning manner.
 Har? He really ponned class yesterday ar! – 'What? Is it true that he played truant (=ponteng, shortened to pon and converted into past tense, hence ponned) yesterday?'
 Har? How come he tio caning?  – 'What? How did he end up being caned?'

Meh

Meh, from Cantonese, is used to form questions expressing surprise or scepticism:
 They never study meh?'Didn't they study? (I thought they did.)'
 You don't like that one meh?'You don't like that? (I thought you did.)'
 Really meh?'Is that really so? (I honestly thought otherwise/I don't believe you.)'

Siah

, also spelled sia or siah, is used to express envy or emphasis. It is a derivative of the Malay vulgar word  (derivative of the parent, used interchangeably but sometimes may imply a stronger emphasis). Originally, it is often used by Malay peers in informal speech between them, sometimes while enraged, and other times having different implications depending on the subject matter:

 – 'Do you have a problem or what?' (negative, enraged) – 'Whoa, Joe brought an iPad today.' (positive, envy) – 'No way, man.' or 'I don't have it, man.' (positive, neutral) – 'Joe got scolded, man.' (positive, emphasis)

Malays may also pronounce it without the l, not following the ia but rather a nasal aah. This particular form of usage is often seen in expressing emphasis. There is a further third application of it, in that a k is added at the end when it will then be pronounced  with the same nasal quality only when ending the word. It is similarly used in emphasis.

However, Singlish itself takes influence only from the general expression of the term without any negative implication, and non-Malay speakers (or Malays speaking to non-Malays) pronounce it either as a nasal sia or simply siah:
 He damn zai sia.'He's damn capable.'
 Wah, heng sia.'Goodness me' (=Wahlau)! 'That was a close shave (=heng)!'

Siao

 Derived from Hokkien. Siao is a common word in Singlish. Literally, it means 'crazy'.
 You siao ah? – 'Are you crazy?' (with sarcasm)
 Siao ang moh! – 'Crazy white people!'

Summary

Summary of discourse and other particles:

MiscellaneousNia, which originated from Hokkien, means 'only', mostly used to play down something that has been overestimated.
 Anna: "I not so old lah, I 18 nia."

"Then you know" is a phrase often used at the end of a sentence or after a warning of the possible negative consequences of an action. Can be directly translated as "and you will regret not heeding my advice". Also a direct translation of the Chinese .
 Mother: "Ah boy, don't run here run there, wait you fall down then you know ah."Aiyyo (also spelled aiyo): A state of surprise. Originally from Chinese .

There is/there are and has/have are both expressed using got, so that sentences can be translated in either way back into British/American/Australasian English. This is equivalent to the Chinese  ('to have'):
 Got question? 'Any questions? / Is there a question? / Do you have a question?'
 Yesterday ar, Marina Bay Sands got so many people one! 'There were so many people at Marina Bay Sands yesterday. / Marina Bay Sands had so many people [there] yesterday.'
 This bus got air-con or not? 'Is there air-conditioning on this bus? / Does this bus have air-conditioning?'
 Where got!? Where is there [this]?, or less politely, 'There isn't/aren't any!'; also more loosely, 'What are you talking about?'; generic response to any accusation. Translation of the Malay  which has the same usage.Can is used extensively as both a question particle and an answer particle. The negative is cannot.
 Gimme can? 'Can you please give that to me?'
 Can! 'Sure!'
 Cannot. 'No way.'

Can can be repeated for greater emphasis or to express enthusiasm:
 Boss: "Can you send me the report by this afternoon?" Employee: "Can, can!" ('No problem!')

The Malay word with the same meaning, can be used in place of can to add a greater sense of multiculturalism in the conversation. The person in a dominant position may prefer to use  instead:
 Employee: "Boss, tomorrow can get my pay check or not?" Boss: "Boleh lah ..." ('sure/possibly')

The phrase like that is commonly appended to the end of the sentence to emphasize descriptions by adding vividness and continuousness. Due to its frequency of use, it is often pronounced lidat:
 He so stupid like that. – 'He really seems pretty stupid, you know.'
 He acting like a one-year-old baby like that. – He's really acting like a one-year-old baby, you know.'
Like that can also be used as in other Englishes:
 Why he acting like that? – 'Why is he acting this way?'
 If like that, how am I going to answer to the gong shi ting? – 'If that's the case, how am I going to answer to the board of directors?'

In British English, also is used before the predicate, while too is used after the predicative at the end of the sentence. In Singlish (also in American and Australian English), also (pronounced oso, see phonology section above) can be used in either position.
 I oso like dis one. – 'I also like this one.'
 I like dis one also. – 'I like this one too.'

Also is also used as a conjunction. In this case, "A also B" corresponds to "B although A".
 I try so hard oso cannot do. ('I tried so hard, and still I can't do it.' or 'I can't do it even though I tried so hard.')

The order of the verb and the subject in an indirect question is the same as a direct question.
 "Eh, you know where is he or not?" 'Excuse me, do you know where he is?'

Ownself is often used in place of yourself, or more accurately, yourself being an individual, in a state of being alone.
 Har? He ownself go party yesterday for what? 'Why did he go to the party alone yesterday?'

Not all expressions with the -self pronouns should be taken literally, but as the omission of by:
 Wah, hungry liao! You eat yourself, we eat ourself, can? ('Hey, I/you should be hungry by this time! Let's split up and eat. ([then meet up again]')

Some people have begun to add extra eds to the past tense of words or to pronounce ed separately, sometimes in a form of exaggeration of the past tense. Most of the time, the user uses it intentionally to mock proper English.
 "Just now go and play game, character dieded siah!" 'When I played a game just now, my character died!'

Vocabulary

Much of Singlish vocabulary is derived from British English, in addition to many loanwords from Sinitic languages, Malay and Tamil. There has been a rise in American English influence in recent years.

In many cases, words of English origin take on the meaning of their Chinese counterparts, resulting in a shift in meaning. (' (from Southern Min, although Singaporeans spell it as ), '); and send can be used to mean 'accompany someone', as in "", possibly under the influence of the Hokkien word . However, the Malay  can also be used to mean both 'send a letter' and 'take children to school', so perhaps both Malay and Chinese have combined to influence the usage of 'send' in Singapore.

See also

 Singlish vocabulary
 List of Singapore abbreviations
 Languages of Singapore
 Singapore English
 Standard Singapore English
 IPA chart for English dialects
 Mandarin Chinese
 Papia Kristang
 Peranakans
 Singaporean Mandarin
 Singdarin
 Singaporean Hokkien
 Speak Good English Movement
 Tamil language
 Indian languages in Singapore
 Manglish
 Hinglish

Notes and references

Sources cited

Further reading
 Brown, Adam (1999). Singapore English in a Nutshell: An Alphabetical Description of its Features. Singapore: Federal Publications. .
 Crewe, William (ed. 1977) The English Language in Singapore. Singapore: Eastern Universities Press.
 Deterding, David (2007). Singapore English. Edinburgh: Edinburgh University Press. .
 Deterding, David, Brown, Adam and Low Ee Ling (eds. 2005) English in Singapore: Phonetic Research on a Corpus. Singapore: McGraw-Hill Education (Asia). .
 Deterding, David, Low Ee Ling and Brown, Adam (eds. 2003) English in Singapore: Research on Grammar. Singapore: McGraw-Hill Education (Asia). .
 Deterding, David and Hvitfeldt, Robert (1994) 'The Features of Singapore English Pronunciation: Implications for Teachers', Teaching and Learning, 15 (1), 98-107. (on-line version)
 Deterding, David and Poedjosoedarmo, Gloria (2001) The Grammar of English: Morphology and Syntax for English Teachers in Southeast Asia. Singapore: Prentice Hall. (Chapter 19: Singapore English). .
 Foley, Joseph (ed. 1988) New Englishes: the Case of Singapore, Singapore: Singapore University Press.
 Foley, J. A., T. Kandiah, Bao Zhiming, A.F. Gupta, L. Alsagoff, Ho Chee Lick, L. Wee, I. S. Talib and W. Bokhorst-Heng (eds. 1998) English in New Cultural Contexts: Reflections from Singapore. Singapore: Singapore Institute of Management/Oxford University Press. .
 Gopinathan, S., Pakir, Anne, Ho Wah Kam and Saravanan, Vanithamani (eds. 1998) Language, Society and Education in Singapore (2nd edition), Singapore: Times Academic Press.
 Gupta, Anthea Fraser (1992) 'Contact features of Singapore Colloquial English'. In Kingsley Bolton and Helen Kwok (eds.) Sociolinguistics Today: International Perspectives, London and New York: Routledge, pp. 323–45.
 Gupta, Anthea Fraser (1994). The Step-Tongue: Children’s English in Singapore. Clevedon, UK: Multimedia Matters. .
 Ho, Mian Lian and Platt, John Talbot (1993). Dynamics of a contact continuum: Singapore English. Oxford: Clarendon Press; New York: Oxford University Press. .
 Lim, Lisa (ed. 2004). Singapore English: a grammatical description. Amsterdam; Philadelphia: John Benjamins. .
 Low, Ee Ling and Brown, Adam (2005) English in Singapore: An Introduction. Singapore: McGraw-Hill.
 Melcher, A. (2003). Unlearning Singlish: 400 Singlish-isms to avoid. Singapore: Andrew Melcher Pte. Ltd. 
 Newbrook, Mark (1987). Aspects of the syntax of educated Singaporean English: attitudes, beliefs, and usage. Frankfurt am Main; New York: P. Lang. .
 Ooi, Vincent B. Y. (ed. 2001) Evolving Identities: the English Language in Singapore. Singapore: Times Academic. .
 Pakir, Anne (1991) ‘The range and depth of English-knowing bilinguals in Singapore’, World Englishes, 10(2), 167–79.
 Platt, John Talbot and Weber, Heidi (1980). English in Singapore: status, features, functions. Kuala Lumpur: Oxford University Press. .
 Shelley, R., Beng, K.-S., & Takut bin Salah. (2000). Sounds and sins of Singlish, and other nonsense. Kuala Lumpur: Times Books International. 
 Tongue, R. K. (1979) The English of Singapore and Malaysia (2nd edition). Singapore: Eastern Universities Press.
 VJ Times Editorial Team. (2000). Singlish to English: basic grammar guide. Singapore: VJ Times. 
 Wee, Lionel (2004) 'Singapore English: Phonology'. In Edgar W. Schneider, Kate Burridge, Bernd Kortmann, Rajend Mesthrie and Clive Upton (eds.) A Handbook of Varieties of English. Volume 1: Phonology, Berlin: Mouton de Gruyter, pp. 1017–33.
 Wee, Lionel (2004) 'Singapore English: morphology and syntax'. In Bernd Kortmann, Kate Burridge, Rajend Mesthrie, Edgar W. Schneider and Clive Upton (eds.) A Handbook of Varieties of English. Volume 2: Morphology and Syntax, Berlin: Mouton de Gruyter, pp. 1058–72.
 Wong, J. O. (2001). The natural semantic metalanguage approach to the universal syntax of the Singlish existential primitive. CAS research paper series, no. 30. Singapore: Centre for Advanced Studies, National University of Singapore.

External links

 The Coxford Singlish Dictionary @ Talkingcock.com
 A Dictionary of Singlish and Singapore English
 Singlish Books to Get Intimate with Locals
 'Hover & Hear' pronunciations in a Standard Singapore English accent, and compare side by side with other English accents from around the World.
 An Annotated Bibliography of Works on Singapore English
 The NIE Corpus of Spoken Singapore English
 The Lim Siew Lwee Corpus of Informal Singapore Speech

 
Languages of Singapore
English-based pidgins and creoles